Lawang Bato National High School is a high school in the Philippines. It is located in Centro St., Lawang Bato, Valenzuela City. and known as the first of having a solar powered library in Metro Manila

External links

{http://philippinelaw.info/statutes/ra8723.html}
{http://www.infoguidephilippines.com/valenzuela-city-metro-manila/education/lawang-bato-national-high-school.html}

High schools in Metro Manila
Schools in Valenzuela, Metro Manila
Public schools in Metro Manila